This list of museums in Arizona encompasses museums which are defined for this context as institutions (including nonprofit organizations, government entities, and private businesses) that collect and care for objects of cultural, artistic, scientific, or historical interest and make their collections or related exhibits available for public viewing. Museums that exist only in cyberspace (i.e., virtual museums) are not included. The list also includes public non-profit art galleries, and national, state and local parks that feature visitor centers with exhibits.

Museums

Defunct museums
 American Museum of Nursing, Tempe
 Arizona Mining and Mineral Museum, Phoenix, closed in 2011
 Bead Museum, Glendale, closed in 2011, collections donated to the Mingei International Museum in San Diego, California
 Champlin Fighter Museum, Mesa, closed in 2003, collections now at Museum of Flight in Tukwila, Washington
 Fleisher Museum, Scottsdale, closed in 2002
 Graham County Historical Society Museum, Thatcher, Facebook site, closed in 2012 when building torn down, seeking new location
 Halle Heart Children's Museum, Tempe
 Heard Museum North, Scottsdale, closed in 2014
 Heard Museum West, Surprise, closed in 2009
Peoria Arizona Historical Society Museum, also known as Peoria Central School Museum, closed in 2017 due to a dispute over control.
 Phoenix Museum of History, Phoenix, closed in 2009
 West Valley Art Museum, Surprise, building closed in 2009 but hosting exhibits in Peoria, website

See also

 Nature Centers in Arizona

References

External links

 Central Arizona Museum Association
 Museum Association of Arizona

Museums
Arizona

Museums
Museums